3BB Nakornnont is a female professional volleyball team based in Nonthaburi, Thailand. The club was founded in 2011 and plays in the Thailand league.

Honours

Domestic competitions 

Thailand League 
 Champion (1): 2011–12
  Runner-up (2): 2008, 2012–13
  Third (1): 2018–19
Thai-Denmark Super League
 Runner-up (1): 2015
  Third (3): 2017, 2018, 2019

Youth League 
Academy League U18 Thailand League
 Champion (1): 2017, 2018, 2019, 2020
 Runner-up (1): 2016
 Third (1): 2015

Former names

 Saijo-denki Nakornnonthaburi (2011–2012)
 Nakornnonthaburi  (2012–2013)
 3BB Nakornnont (2013–present)

Team colors 
Thailand League

    (2011–present)

Thai-Denmark Super League

   (2013–present)

Stadium and locations

Crest 
he club logo incorporates elements from their nickname; The Red Dino and their owner Pheasant destroyer 3 Broad Band

League results

Team roster 2020–21 
As of November 2019

Head coach :  Thanakit Inleang

Sponsors 

 3BB Internet
 Grand Sport

Position Main 

The following is the 3BB Nakornnont roster in the : Thailand League 2020-21

2019–20 Results and fixtures

Thailand League

First leg

Imports

Head coach

Team Captain 

  Jutarat Montripila (2011–2013)
  Malika Kanthong (2013–2015)
  Lindsay Stalzer (2015)
 Narumon Khanan (2015–2016)
  Tichaya Boonlert (2016–2017)
  Narumon Khanan (2017–2020)
  Kuttika Kaewpin (2020–present)

Notable players 

Domestic Players

 Kamonporn Sukmak
 Pornpun Guedpard
 Jutarat Montripila
 Surasawadee Boonyuen
 Wanna Buakaew
 Karina Krause 
 Malika Kanthong 
 Kullapa Piampongsan
 Amporn Hyapha 
 Chatchu-on Moksri
 Bang-on Wannaprapa
 Natthanicha Jaisaen
 Paweenut Reungram
 Kanjana Kuthaisong
 Jantana Chanchat
 Rujiraporn Pawanna
 Narumon Khanan

Foreign Players

   Đinh Thi Tra Giang 

   Chloe Mann 
   Lindsay Stalzer
   Therese McNatt

   Meryem Çalık

   Fatou Diouck

   Eva Chantava

   Alyssa Valdez

   Yeung Sau Mei

   Alexandra Garcia

   Caroline Godoi

   Nizeva Evgeniia

References

External links
 Official fanpage

Volleyball clubs in Thailand